Abbotsford-Mission is a provincial electoral district in British Columbia, Canada established by the Electoral Districts Act, 2008.  It came into effect upon the dissolution of the 38th BC Parliament in April 2009, and was first contested in the ensuing election.

History

Member of Legislative Assembly 
On account of the realignment of electoral boundaries, most incumbents did not represent the entirety of their listed district during the preceding legislative term. Randy Hawes, British Columbia Liberal Party was initially elected during the 2005 election and 2001 election to the Maple Ridge-Mission riding.

Electoral history

References

British Columbia provincial electoral districts
Mission, British Columbia
Politics of Abbotsford, British Columbia
Provincial electoral districts in Greater Vancouver and the Fraser Valley